Dörtyol, historically Chok Merzimen ('four reaches'), is a city in Hatay Province, Turkey. It is a port city and oil terminus located 26 km north of the city of Iskenderun, near the easternmost point of the Mediterranean at the head of the Gulf of İskenderun.

Geography
The name Dörtyol means "crossroads" (literally "four roads") in Turkish, and the town indeed sits on a crossing of highways, especially the O-53 from Anatolia south into Hatay and on to Syria. The road is channelled along the narrow coastal strip with the Nur Mountains (the ancient Amanos) behind. Dörtyol is at the edge of the Çukurova Plain and being near the coast, it is humid, and the countryside is fairly green and fertile. Therefore, alongside oil handling, the economic activities of the district include forestry, cotton, and the cultivation of citrus fruits, especially a local variety of tangerines.

History
This crossroads has seen the passage of numerous armies and some of the biggest military campaigns in history, including the Battle of Issus between Alexander the Great and Darius in 333 BC. 

Approximately 8000 Armenians lived in Dörtyol in 1908 and 12300 on the eve of the First World War. Armenians also knew the settlement as Chork Marzban(k) or Chork Marzvan(k). In 1895 the Armenians of Dörtyol resisted the Hamidian Massacres.  In 1909, during the Adana Massacre, the Armenians of Dörtyol  resisted the massacres again, but many of them were killed. From 1919 to 1921, the Armenians again resisted the Armenian genocide, but were almost completely exterminated. After the French and Turks agreed on the Syrian-Turkish border, Dörtyol fell on the Turkish side, and the surviving Armenians fled to Alexandretta, Aleppo, and Amman.

Dörtyol is remembered in Turkey as the scene of the first fighting in the Turkish War of Independence. The fighting with the occupying forces was ignited in Karakese, which is located on the edge of the mountainous village of Nur. In 1918, Dörtyol was occupied by French troops. Turks in the area retreated to the hills and began their resistance under the leadership of Kara Hasan Paşa. Thus, Dörtyol ultimately never became part of the Republic of Hatay, but instead functioned as a Turkish district added to Hatay when the province was brought into the Turkish Republic in 1939.

Demographics

History
According to travellers Carl Humann and Otto Puchstein, during the 19th century, the town of Chok Merzimen was exclusively inhabited by Armenians with 300 homes.

Popular culture
The town is mentioned in The Forty Days of Musa Dagh.

References

External links 
 Photos of Dörtyol
 Dortyol Guide

Populated places in Hatay Province
Districts of Hatay Province
Cities in Turkey